Hans Adametz (17 August 1896 – 26 September 1966) was an Austrian ceramist, sculptor and art educator.

Life 
Born in Vienna, Adametz attended the Ceramic College in Znojmo and studied with Oskar Strnad and Michael Powolny at the University of Applied Arts Vienna. He attended further training courses at the Gmunden Ceramic Workshops and at Wienerberg. After teaching in Wiener Neustadt and Mödling, he was appointed to the HTBLVA Graz-Ortweinschule in Graz in 1922. He was a professor and art ceramist at the State College of Clay Industry in Znojmo. He was also a lecturer at the Technical University of Graz.

Adametz died in Graz at the age of 70.

Students
 Franz Josef Altenburg

Exhibitions 
Source:

Solo exhibitions 
 Vienna
 1956 (with W. Berg);
 1962 (with A. Wahl and A. Birstinger)
 1968 Graz, Joanneum (cat., 98 works)

Group exhibitions 

 Graz, partly annually since 1926, Werkbund and Secession
 1923, '27, '28, '53, '55 Vienna, Museum of Applied Arts
 1924 Stuttgart: The form
 1925 Paris, boarding school. Arts and crafts exhibition
 1927 Berlin, German Ceramic Society
 1928 Cologne, Pressa
 1930 Stockholm, applied arts
 1930 Warsaw, Austrian exhibition
 1933 Milan, Triennale
 1934 London, Austrian exhibition
 1935 Brussels, world exhibition
 1942 Strasbourg
 1958 Passau: European Weeks
 Berlin-West, Werkbund
 1960 Bremen, Werkbund
 1961, 1965 Graz: Religions

Works 
  1928: Keramik Frühlingsbotin
 1933: Figur Mohr.
 1939: Figur Adler – Teil des Anschlussdenkmals in Oberschützen.
 Keramiken Sitzende Frau, Der Zauberer, Liegende.

Source:

 Graz
 Joanneum: figurative ceram. Plastic (6 major works).
 Crematorium forecourt: people praying, life-size, around 1930 (removed in 1938).
 Burg Ehrenhof: busts by J. J. Fux and J. B. Fischer von Erlach, Stein, around 1942, executed around 1950.
 Chapel of the seminary: Herz-Jesu-Plastik, 1952/53 (formerly for the Sanatorium of the Cross Sisters).
 Kanhäuser privately owned: several works.
 Seckau, private ownership: Christ.
 Vienna, Austria Gallery: 3 sculptures.
 Faenza, Mus. Internaz. delle Ceramiche.

References 

20th-century Austrian sculptors
Austrian ceramists
1896 births
1966 deaths
Artists from Vienna